Ascha is a municipality in the district of Straubing-Bogen in Bavaria, Germany.

References

Straubing-Bogen